HMS Magpie is a survey ship of the Royal Navy, intended for use on inshore and coastal survey work. Magpie replaced . She was accepted by the RN in May 2018 and commissioned on 28 June 2018.

History

In August 2017, the replacement for HMS Gleaner, the Royal Navy's existing inshore survey launch, was announced to be one of a total of 38 multi-role workboats of various sizes being constructed to undertake various duties. The main structure of the vessel was constructed by Safehaven Marine, a boatbuilding company based in Cork. In February 2018, it was announced that the ship would be named HMS Magpie. The type selected for the inshore survey vessel was based on Safehaven's Wildcat 60 catamaran design, the largest available at 18m in length, and with a displacement of 37 tonnes. Magpie was built to accommodate a crew of 12 for up to seven days, with the capability of operating in all weathers. Following completion and initial trials by Safehaven Marine, Magpie was subsequently delivered to Atlas Elektronik UK (AEUK) for installation of its mission equipment. In April 2018, Magpie underwent further trials with its mission equipment installed, before final delivery of the vessel to the Royal Navy in May 2018 for commissioning in early summer.

As Magpie is considerably larger than the vessel she replaces, the title of smallest commissioned vessel in the Royal Navy, which had belonged to Gleaner, passed to the two s. Magpie is a significant improvement over her predecessor, both in terms of equipment – she features better on-board equipment than Gleaner, but also designed for operating UUVs – and endurance.

Once the work in Portsmouth harbour is complete, the Magpie will head to the wreck site of the Mary Rose, Henry VIIIs flagship, to survey the sea floor for anything of significance.

Work will then begin on investigating the wreck of a French galley which was lost off the north-east coast of the Isle of Wight around the same time as the Mary Rose.

References

External links

 HMS Magpie official website

2018 ships
Survey vessels of the Royal Navy